Adjouan is a town in south-eastern Ivory Coast. It is a sub-prefecture of Aboisso Department in Sud-Comoé Region, Comoé District.

Adjouan was a commune until March 2012, when it became one of 1126 communes nationwide that were abolished.
In 2014, the population of the sub-prefecture of Adjouan was 25,088.

Villages
The twelve villages of the sub-prefecture of Adjouan and their population in 2014 are:

References

Sub-prefectures of Sud-Comoé
Former communes of Ivory Coast